The Speedway World Cup is an annual speedway event held each year in different countries. The first edition of the competition in the current format was held in 2001 and replaced the old World Team Cup which ran from 1960 until 2000. The last edition was in 2017. From 2018, the World Cup was replaced by the Speedway of Nations, which effectively brought back the pairs format. However, in 2023 the World Cup will return.

Past winners

Medal classification

Champions

This is a complete list of speedway riders who won the Speedway World Cup. In total, 34 different riders from 4 national teams have a World Cup title. Bold indicates the most recent champions.

Participating nations

Legend
 – Champions.
 – Runners-up.
 – Third place.
4–12 – 4th to 12th places.
 –  Qualified, but withdrew.
 – Did not qualify.
 – Did not enter or withdrew.
 – Country did not exist or national team was inactive.
 – Race-off and final hosts.
Q – Qualified for upcoming tournament.
q – Will take part in the upcoming qualification.

Format

The final tournament usually lasted for about a week with four meetings held in six or seven days. It started with two first round "events", each consisting of four national teams. The winners of these events qualified automatically for the final, while those who finished second and third competed in the race-off. Last place finishers were eliminated. The top two in the race-off joined the event winners in the final. The winners of the final carried home the Ove Fundin Trophy, named after one of the all-time greats of speedway who won the world championship five times.

The two events were held in different countries, normally in one of the countries that competed in that event. The race-off and the final was held in another country that did not host an event. For example, in the 2014 competition, Great Britain and Sweden hosted the two events, while Poland hosted both the race-off and final. From 2012 onwards the host nation was seeded directly to the final.

Rules

Each of the four meetings were competed between four national teams, and each national team were represented by four riders + one reserve rider, who had to be under 21 years of age. The nomination of the reserve rider was not compulsory. 

Team A (helmet colour red).
Team B (blue).
Team C (white).
Team D (yellow/black).

The meetings lasted for 20 heats with one rider for each competing team racing in each heat. Each rider was scheduled to race in five heats and face each of the opposing nations' riders once during the meeting. Teams scored 3 points if their rider won a heat, 2 points if their rider finished second, 1 for a third-place finish, and none if their rider finished last or was excluded from a heat.

The U-21 reserve rider could take place of any other rider in his team at any time during the meeting, not exceeding a total amount of five programmed rides permitted. If a team fell six points behind the leader then they were allowed to make tactical substitutions, replacing a rider who is possibly out of form for one who is playing better in the hope of closing the gap on the leader. Each rider, however, could be used as a tactical substitute once only, and it was their additional (sixth) ride in the meeting. Each team was also allowed to play one tactical "joker" if they fell six points behind the leader. The joker did not have to be used only as a replacement of another rider. A rider who should have to participate in a heat due to the schedule, might have also been used as joker in that heat, replacing himself. With the joker, a team scored double the points their finishing position was usually worth, so if their rider finished first, they picked up six points instead of the normal three. Both of these special rules were implemented with the intention of keeping interest in meetings that may have been a foregone conclusion. No tactical substitutions and jokers were allowed to be used during heats 17-20 though a reserve substitution could still be used. The final four heats were nominated by their team managers. The lowest scoring team had first pick followed the team in third place, then the second place team, and finally the leading team.

See also
Speedway Grand Prix
Team Speedway Junior World Championship (U-21)
List of world championships

References

 
Speedway competitions
World cups
Recurring sporting events established in 2001
Recurring sporting events disestablished in 2017